Jérémy Davies (born December 4, 1996) is a Canadian professional ice hockey defenseman currently playing for the  Buffalo Sabres of the National Hockey League (NHL). He  was selected by the New Jersey Devils in the 7th round, 192nd overall, of the 2016 NHL Entry Draft.

Playing career
Davies previously played collegiate hockey for the Northeastern Huskies in the NCAA. He was acquired by the Predators in a 2019 trade along with Steven Santini and two second round draft picks from the New Jersey Devils for P. K. Subban.

As a free agent from the Predators, Davies was signed to a one-year, two-way contract with the Buffalo Sabres on July 13, 2022.

Career statistics

Awards and honours

References

External links

1996 births
Living people
Anglophone Quebec people
AHCA Division I men's ice hockey All-Americans
Buffalo Sabres players
Canadian ice hockey defencemen
Chicago Wolves players
Milwaukee Admirals players
Nashville Predators players
New Jersey Devils draft picks
Northeastern Huskies men's ice hockey players
People from Sainte-Anne-de-Bellevue, Quebec
Rochester Americans players
Waterloo Black Hawks players